Baldwin-Woodville Area High School is a public school serving grades 9 through 12 in Baldwin, St. Croix County, Wisconsin, United States. The principal of Baldwin-Woodville for the 2013–2014 school year is Dave Branvold. Eric Russell, previous principal, is now the superintendent of the school district.

References

External links
Baldwin-Woodville Area School District
Village of Baldwin

Public high schools in Wisconsin
Schools in St. Croix County, Wisconsin